The Travel and Tourism Competitiveness Report was first published in 2007 by the World Economic Forum (WEF). The 2007 report covered 124 major and emerging economies. The 2008 report covered 130 countries, the 2009 report expanded to 133 countries, and the 2011 report to 139 countries. The index is a measurement of the factors that make it attractive to develop business in the travel and tourism industry of individual countries, rather than a measure of a country attractiveness as a tourist destination. The report ranks selected nations according to the Travel and Tourism Competitiveness Index (TTCI), which scores from 1 to 6 the performance of a given country in each specific subindex. The overall index is made of three main subindexes: (1) regulatory framework; (2) business environment and infrastructure; and (3) human, cultural, and natural resources. The Report also includes a specific Country Profile for each of the nations evaluated, with each of the scores received to estimate its TTCI, and complementary information regarding key economic indicators from the World Bank, and country indicators from the World Tourism Organization and the World Travel and Tourism Council. The last Travel & Tourism Competitiveness Report was published in 2019.

From the 2021 report, WEF publishes the Travel and Tourism Development Index (TTDI) as an evolution of the TTCI.

Variables
For the 2008 index, each of the three main subindexes is made of the scoring of the following 14 variables, called pillars in the TTC Report. Several changes were introduced in the 2008 TTCI in the definition of the variables as compared to the definitions of the 2007 TTCI.  First, the “environmental regulation” pillar was improved with help from the IUCN and the UNWTO, and for the 2008 index was renamed the “environmental sustainability” pillar to “better reflect its components and to capture the increasingly recognized importance of sustainability in the sector’s development.” Second, the original pillar “natural and cultural resources” was divided into two separate subcomponents: “natural resources” and “cultural resources”, thus, allowing to differentiate those countries which do not necessarily have the same strengths or weaknesses in these two different resources. In general, the model was improved with better data and new concepts were introduced. The 2009 and 2011 reports kept the same 14 variables.

2021 Ranking

Top 30 Countries

2019 Ranking

Top 30 Countries

2017 Ranking

Top 30 Countries

2015 Ranking

Top 30 Countries

2013 Ranking

Top 30 Countries

2011 Ranking

Top 30 Countries

Top 10 Ranking by Continent 

The number in parentheses in the continent ranking corresponds to the position in the world's ranking for the overall index for 2011.

Top 10 Middle East 
   4.78 (30)
  4.47 (40)
  4.45 (42)
  4.41 (46)
  4.18 (61)
  4.17 (62)
  4.14 (64)
  4.03 (70)

Top 10 Americas 
  5.30 (6)
  5.29 (9) 
  4.84 (28)
  4.43 (43)
  4.43 (44)
  4.42 (45)
  4.36 (52)
  4.30 (56)
  4.27 (57)
  4.24 (58)

Top 10 Asia Pacific 
  5.23 (10)
  5.19 (12)
  5.15 (13)
  5.00 (19)
  4.94 (22)
  4.71 (32)
  4.59 (35)
  4.56 (37)
  4.47 (39)
  4.47 (41)

Top 10 Sub-Saharan Africa 
  4.35 (53)
  4.11 (66)
  3.84 (84)
  3.77 (89)
  3.74 (91)
  3.70 (92)
  3.54 (102)
  3.51 (103)
  3.49 (104)
  3.44 (108)

Top 10 Europe 
  5.68 (1)
  5.50 (2)
  5.41 (3)
  5.41 (4)
  5.34 (5) 
  5.30 (7) 
  5.29 (8)
  5.19 (11)
  5.13 (14)
  5.08 (15)

2009 Ranking

Top 20 Countries

Top 10 Ranking by Continent 

The number in parentheses in the continent ranking corresponds to the position in the world's ranking for the overall index for 2009.

Top 10 Middle East and Africa
  4.57 (33)
  4.50 (36)
  4.49 (37)
  4.43 (40)
  4.42 (41)
  4.37 (44)
  4.25 (54)
  4.10 (61)
  4.09 (64)
  4.01 (68)

Top 10 Americas 
  5.32 (5)
  5.28 (8)
  4.77 (30)
  4.42 (42)
  4.35 (45)
  4.29 (51)
  4.27 (53)
  4.23 (55)
  4.18 (57)
  4.13 (60)

Top 10 Asia Pacific 
  5.24 (9)
  5.24 (10)
  5.18 (12)
  4.94 (20)
  4.91 (25)
  4.72 (31)
  4.71 (32)
  4.45 (39)
  4.40 (43)
  4.33 (47)

Top 10 Europe 
  5.68 (1)
  5.46 (2)
  5.41 (3)
  5.34 (4)
  5.29 (6)
  5.28 (7)
  5.22 (11)
  5.09 (13)
  5.08 (14)
  5.07 (15)

2008 Ranking

Top 20 Countries

Top 10 Ranking by Continent 

The number in parentheses in the continent ranking corresponds to the position in the world's ranking for the overall index in 2008.

Top 10 Africa
  4.41 (39)
  4.38 (41)
  4.11 (60)
  3.96 (66)
  3.91 (67)
  3.67 (84)
  3.65 (87)
  3.65 (88)
  3.59 (93)
  3.53 (101)

Top 10 Americas 
  5.28 (7)
  5.26 (9)
  4.77 (29)
  4.35 (44)
  4.34 (46)
  4.29 (49)
  4.29 (50)
  4.27 (51)
  4.18 (55)
  4.18 (57)

Top 10 Asia 
  5.09 (14)
  5.06 (16)
  4.90 (23)
  4.68 (31)
  4.63 (32)
  4.51 (35)
  4.44 (37)
  4.39 (40)
  4.37 (42)
  4.29 (48)

Top 10 Europe 
  5.63 (1)
  5.43 (2)
  5.41 (3)
  5.30 (5)
  5.28 (6)
  5.27 (8)
  5.23 (10)
  5.16 (11)
  5.11 (12)
  5.10 (13)

Top 2 Oceania 
  5.34 (4)
  4.96 (19)

References

External links

Tourism-related lists
International rankings